Andy Whelan was a footballer from County Laois.

He was a native of the Kildare border village of Jamestown, near Ballybrittas.

He played as goalkeeper when Laois won the Leinster Senior Football Championship final against Kildare in 1946.

Laois didn't win the Leinster Senior Football Championship again until 2003 when Mick O'Dwyer led them to victory and another Ballybrittas native, Fergal Byron was goalkeeper.

References

Further reading
 Laois GAA Yearbook Leinster Express, 1999 
 Comhairle Laighean 1900-2000 Tom Ryall, 2000
 Complete Handbook of Gaelic Games Raymond Smith, 1999

Year of birth missing
Jamestown Gaelic footballers
Laois inter-county Gaelic footballers
Possibly living people